Jacobus Frederik "Jacques" Smalle is a South African politician from Limpopo who has been serving as a Member of the Limpopo Provincial Legislature since 2014, and previously from 2009 to 2010. He has also been a deputy federal chairperson of the Democratic Alliance since 2020. In 2012, he was elected Provincial Leader of the Democratic Alliance in the province. From 2010 to 2014, he was a Member of the National Assembly where he served as the Shadow Deputy Minister of Energy and as the Shadow Deputy Minister of Arts and Culture. Smalle was the Democratic Alliance's Limpopo Premier candidate for the 2019 election.

Early life 
Smalle was born on 28 June 1970 in the Louis Trichardt Memorial Hospital in the town of Louis Trichardt.

Early political career 
Smalle is a founding member of the Democratic Alliance. He was also an activist for vulnerable children in the Limpopo town of Oudtshoorn during the 1990s. In 2000, he was elected as an Oudtshoorn municipal councilor. In 2006, he was elected as a Makhado Local Municipality councilor and served as a councilor until his election to the Limpopo Provincial Legislature in May 2009.

Parliamentary career 
In September 2010, he took office as a Member of the National Assembly of South Africa. Parliamentary Leader of the Democratic Alliance Athol Trollip released a statement on 6 September 2010, in which he named Smalle as the new Shadow Deputy Minister of Arts and Culture. Smalle served in the position until newly-elected Parliamentary Leader of the Democratic Alliance Lindiwe Mazibuko appointed him to the position of Shadow Deputy Minister of Energy in February 2012.

In June 2012, Smalle unseated incumbent Provincial Leader Désirée van der Walt. He was declared the winner after four candidates were eliminated. National Leader of the Democratic Alliance Helen Zille urged delegates not to vote on the basis of their race.

Return to the provincial legislature 
In May 2014, Smalle returned to the Limpopo Provincial Legislature as leader of the Democratic Alliance caucus. He currently sits on the committees on Agriculture, Public Accounts, Rules and Ethics, and Education in the provincial legislature.

Smalle won re-election to a second term as Provincial Leader of the Limpopo Democratic Alliance in February 2015. In October 2017, he was re-elected for a third term as Provincial Leader.

On 15 September 2018, National Democratic Alliance Leader Mmusi Maimane announced Smalle as the party's Limpopo Premier candidate for the 2019 election.

In the 2019 election, the Democratic Alliance retained its position as the third-largest party in the provincial legislature, though the party did lose support to the Freedom Front Plus.

DA national leadership 
Smalle was elected as the third deputy federal chairperson of the DA in 2020. He serves alongside Refiloe Nt'sekhe and Anton Bredell.

Suspension 
In early-March 2021, a report by the Federal Legal Commission of the DA, which recommended that disciplinary steps be taken against Smalle for abusing party funds and fraud, was leaked two years after it was reportedly published. The DA leadership reportedly did not act on it when it was published  The DA national leadership subsequently postponed its provincial elective conference and placed the party's provincial office under administration as it investigated the allegations against Smalle. Smalle was running for a fourth term as provincial leader against DA MP Solly Malatsi. Smalle has denied the allegations.

On 26 April 2021, Smalle was suspended from party activities by the Federal Executive (FedEx) of the DA for alleged tax fraud and abuse of party funds. He then faced a disciplinary hearing.

Smalle was reinstated on 13 March 2023 following a lengthy internal party disciplinary process which found him not guilty of the five charges brought against him by the party. He is to continue serving as a Member of the Limpopo Legislature and as leader of the DA caucus until 31 March 2023  after which he is to resign to become a Member of Parliament for the DA.

Personal life
He was married to Heidi Smalle; they had two children together, Pierre and Juan. Juan committed suicide on 28 January 2023 on his father's farm in Makhado.

Smalle speaks three languages: English, Afrikaans and TshiVenda.

References 

|-

|-

Living people
Democratic Alliance (South Africa) politicians
Members of the National Assembly of South Africa
1970 births
People from Louis Trichardt
Afrikaner people
Members of the Limpopo Provincial Legislature